The Al-Serkal Mosque is the main mosque in Phnom Penh, the capital of  Cambodia. It was a gift from Al Serkal Family, United Arab Emirates and opened in 1968. It is situated north of the town, near the Boeung Kak lake, which is now dry.

A new building, gift of the United Arab Emirates, has replaced the original mosque, it opened in 2014.

See also
 Islam in Cambodia

References

Mosques in Phnom Penh
1968 establishments in Cambodia
Mosques completed in 2014